The Mayor of Pisa is an elected politician who, along with the Pisa's City Council, is accountable for the strategic government of Pisa in Tuscany, Italy. 

The current Mayor is Michele Conti, a member of the right-wing populist party Lega Nord, who took office on 27 June 2018.

Overview
According to the Italian Constitution, the Mayor of Pisa is member of the City Council.

The Mayor is elected by the population of Pisa, who also elect the members of the City Council, controlling the Mayor's policy guidelines and is able to enforce his resignation by a motion of no confidence. The Mayor is entitled to appoint and release the members of his government.

Since 1994 the Mayor is elected directly by Pisa's electorate: in all mayoral elections in Italy in cities with a population higher than 15,000 the voters express a direct choice for the mayor or an indirect choice voting for the party of the candidate's coalition. If no candidate receives at least 50% of votes, the top two candidates go to a second round after two weeks. The election of the City Council is based on a direct choice for the candidate with a preference vote: the candidate with the majority of the preferences is elected. The number of the seats for each party is determined proportionally.

Kingdom of Italy (1861–1946)
In 1865, the Kingdom of Italy created the office of the Mayor of Pisa (Sindaco di Pisa), appointed by the King himself. From 1889 to 1926 the Mayor was elected by the City council. In 1926, the Fascist dictatorship abolished mayors and City councils, replacing them with an authoritarian Podestà chosen by the National Fascist Party. The office of Mayor was restored in 1944 during the Allied occupation.

Republic of Italy (since 1946)

City Council election (1946-1994)
From 1946 to 1994, the Mayor of Pisa was elected by the City's Council.

Direct election (since 1994)
Since 1994, under provisions of new local administration law, the Mayor of Pisa is chosen by direct election, originally every four, and since 2003 every five years.

Notes

Timeline

References

Pisa
 
Politics of Tuscany